Ahmed Uthman Effendi (also spelled Ahmed Othman) (1879 – December 10, 1946) also known as Ahmed Effendi, was a Kurdish politician from Erbil who played an important role in shaping events and the direction of public administration in Iraqi Kurdistan in the first half of the twentieth century.

He was the first Mutasarrif (governor) of Erbil in the first Iraqi government (1921-1927), the Mutasarrif of Sulaymaniyah (1927-1929), member of the Iraqi House of Notables or Senate "Majlis al-Ayan" (1929-1937), and Member of the House of Deputies "Majlis al-Nuwaab" representing Erbil (1937-1946).

Family 

Ahmed Uthman's family is traced back to an intellectual and respected family of Islamic scholars who emigrated Iran along with other families during the 16th century to settle in Erbil at the time of Shah Ismail I Safawi of Iran. The reason of the emigration was of differences between the chief leader of the family and the Shah then.

His family was widely known and influential throughout Kurdistan for their piety and leaning. They were teaching Islamic studies at the Great Mosque at the Citadel of Erbil for several generations before him. His grandfather, Abu Bakr III Effendi, was an influential religious leader who was always  referred to as Küçük Mulla, or Malla i Gichka (Little Mulla), because he completed his study of Islamic sciences in a record period as no one had done before in that age. Ahmed Uthman was a cousin of Mulla Effendi, a famous Kurdish personality.

Life 

Ahmed Uthman was born in Mosul in 1879 where his father was serving as a Judge. In 1906, he was appointed a judge in Erbil, and later in 1911 was appointed judge in Mosul. During the last years of the Ottoman Empire in 1917 he became the Mayor of Erbil.

In 1923, after the formation of the first Iraqi government, Ahmed Uthman was appointed Mutasarrif of Erbil until 1927 where he became the Mutasarrif of Sulaymaniyah. In 1929 he moved to Baghdad where he was appointed a member of the Iraqi House of Notables in Baghdad, and remained a Senator until 1937, when he was elected member of the House of Deputies representing Erbil. He remained Member of the Parliament for three consecutive parliamentary periods until his death on December 10, 1946.

The famous Iraqi historian and sociologist Dr. Ali al-Wardi in his six volumes "the Social Glimpses of the History of Modern Iraq" describes Ahmed Uthman's wisdom and ability in saving the city of Erbil when it was surrounded and threatened by rebellious tribesmen, in meeting with the tribesmen outside the gates of the city all on his own, negotiating with their leaders, meeting some of their demands, and persuading them to leave, at the time that there was no military protection in the city.

Relations with United Kingdom 
Ahmed Uthman maintained good relations with the British administration in Iraq throughout the British Mandate.

Gertrude Bell's letter to her father on 19 November 1922 describing Ahmed Uthman:

Other British administrators and advisers such as Lieut.-Colonel Sir Rupert Hay, the British Political Officer of Erbil, author of "Two Years in Kurdistan.   Experiences of a Political Officer 1918-1920", and Cecil John Edmonds, praised his insight and role.

References

1879 births
1946 deaths
People from Erbil
Iraqi Kurdistani politicians
Iraqi politicians